Agara (Georgian:აგარა) is a town in Kareli Municipality, Shida Kartli, Georgia. Agara has a population of 3,364. (2014)

Populated places in Shida Kartli